The 1979 Cincinnati Bearcats football team represented University of Cincinnati during 1979 NCAA Division I-A football season. The Bearcats, led by head coach Ralph Staub, participated as independent and played their home games at Nippert Stadium.

Schedule

Roster

References

Cincinnati
Cincinnati Bearcats football seasons
Cincinnati Bearcats football